Doom 3: Worlds on Fire, released on February 26, 2008, is the first book in a planned series of three novels. Before writing the book, its author Matthew Costello wrote the scripts for Doom 3 and Doom 3: Resurrection of Evil.

Synopsis

The year is 2144 and the battle over Earth's precious resources has raged for a century. With global economies in ruins and all-out world war more than a possibility, the U.S government turned to the Union Aerospace Corporation, giving it carte blanche on the legendary red planet of Mars in a desperate bid to construct an off-world outpost that might provide resources and a military advantage, as well as something so secret that even members of the government do not have a clue about it.

Special ops marine lieutenant John Kane was once a careerist simply glad to have a job, and could not care less about politics as long as Uncle Sam's check cleared. But that was before he listened to his conscience and disobeyed a direct order. Busted down to private, Kane has been reassigned to the "U.S. Space Marines" - the private army of the UAC - with the prospect of becoming little more than a glorified security guard on Mars.

Now Pvt. Kane's fate leads him to Mars City - part environmental community, part lab center, and all owned and protected by the UAC. It is a strange world with a fatal environment, and the thousands who live and work within the city have already begun to think of themselves as Martians. And away from Mars City, at the strange ancient sites uncovered on the planet, a small squad of marines stand guard while scientists uncover wall glyphs and search for artifacts, having already found something that is so far amazing and inexplicable - including the relic called "U1," nicknamed "the Soul Cube" - and unknown to all, the bringer of destructive chaos and unspeakable horror...

Reception
Time magazine stated that Worlds on Fire tells the same story as the game, but noted that it did so with "surprisingly artistic tenderness".

References

External links
 Matthew Costello official website
 Doom 3: Worlds on Fire on Simon & Schuster

2008 novels
Novels based on Doom (franchise)
2000s horror novels
2008 science fiction novels
Novels set in the 22nd century
2000 American novels